Julio Arboleda Pombo (9 June 1817, Barbacoas, Colombia – 1862) was a Colombian poet, journalist, and politician. He was also a prominent slave owner, and led a failed rebellion in 1851 with the aim of preventing the abolition of slavery in the country.

Biography
He was educated in Europe and on his return to Colombia engaged in journalism. In the various Colombian revolutions he was a liberal Conservative and more than once declined the vice-presidency of the republic. In 1856 he joined the Conservative revolt in Antioquia, and soon became the leader of his faction. He concluded an alliance with President Moreno, of Ecuador, and made war upon the Federalist dictator, Mosquera. With the support of the states of western Colombia, he assumed supreme power, but soon afterwards was assassinated, by political enemies it is supposed.

Poetry
He wrote in French, English, and Italian, as well as in his own language, Spanish. His poems are much esteemed in Spanish-American literature. Titles include “Dios y la virtud” (God and virtue), “Estoy en la cárcel” (I am in jail), “Me ausento” (I leave), “Te quiero” (I love you) and the long one called “Gonzalo de Oyón” (Gonzalo of Oyón). The manuscript of “Gonzalo de Oyón,” called by some his most important work, was almost completely destroyed by an opponent, and only fragmentary copies are preserved. A collection of Arboleda's poetry was republished in New York in 1884.

Notes

References
 

Attribution
 
 

1817 births
1862 deaths
19th-century Colombian poets
Colombian male poets
Colombian journalists
Male journalists
Presidential Designates of Colombia
Colombian politicians
19th-century journalists
19th-century male writers